The 2009 Interwetten Austrian Open Kitzbühel is a men's tennis tournament played on outdoor clay courts. It is the 29th edition of the tournament and was part of the World Tour 250 series of the 2009 ATP World Tour. It was held at the Tennis stadium Kitzbühel in Kitzbuehel Austria from 16 May until 23 May 2009. Unseeded Guillermo García-López won the singles title.

Entrants

Seeds

 Seedings are based on the rankings of May 11, 2009.

Other entrants
The following players received wildcards into the main draw:

  Andreas Beck
  Daniel Köllerer
  Stefan Koubek

The following players received entry from the qualifying draw:
  Mario Ančić
  Nicolás Lapentti
  Robin Vik
  Juan Ignacio Chela
  Rubén Ramírez Hidalgo (lucky loser replacing Robert Kendrick)
  Paul Capdeville (lucky loser replacing Nikolay Davydenko)
  Julien Benneteau (lucky loser replacing Nicolas Devilder)

Finals

Singles

 Guillermo García-López defeated  Julien Benneteau, 3–6, 7–6(7–1), 6–3
It was García-López's first career title.

Doubles

 Marcelo Melo /  André Sá defeated  Andrei Pavel /  Horia Tecău, 6–7(9–11), 6–2, [10–7]

References

External links
Official website
Singles Draw
Doubles Draw

 
Interwetten Austrian Open Kitzbuehel
Austrian Open Kitzbühel
2009 in Austrian tennis